Edgton is a civil parish in Shropshire, England.  It contains 14 listed buildings that are recorded in the National Heritage List for England.  Of these, one is at Grade II*, the middle of the three grades, and the others are at Grade II, the lowest grade.  The parish contains the village of Edgton and the surrounding countryside.  Apart from a milestone, all the listed buildings are in the village.  Most of these are farmhouses, farm buildings, and houses, many of them timber framed and dating from the 16th and 17th centuries.  The other listed buildings are a church, and a sundial and a tomb in the churchyard.


Key

Buildings

Notes and references

Notes

Citations

Sources

Lists of buildings and structures in Shropshire